The Mitsubishi Mirage R5 is a rally car developed by Ralliart Sweden and built by Mitsubishi Motors. It is based upon the Mitsubishi Mirage road car and is built to R5 regulations. The car was launched in September 2014.

References

External links
 
 Mitsubishi Mirage R5 at eWRC-results.com

All-wheel-drive vehicles
Mitsubishi Motors vehicles
R5 cars